Dillard University is a private, historically black university in New Orleans, Louisiana. Founded in 1930 and incorporating earlier institutions founded as early as 1869 after the American Civil War, it is affiliated with the United Church of Christ and the United Methodist Church.

History 

The history of Dillard University dates to 1869 and its founding predecessor institutions—Straight University (later renamed Straight College) and Union Normal School (which developed into New Orleans University).

Straight University 

Responding to the post-Civil War need to educate newly freed African Americans in New Orleans, Louisiana, and the surrounding region, the American Missionary Association of the Congregational Church founded Straight University on June 12, 1868.

Straight University also offered professional training, including a law department from 1874 to 1886. Its graduates participated in local and national Reconstruction and post-Reconstruction era civil rights struggles.

Straight University was renamed Straight College in 1915, to better reflect the limitations of its curriculum.

Union Normal School/New Orleans University 

The Union Normal School was established on July 8, 1868, by the Freedman's Aid Society of the Methodist Episcopal Church to train teachers. The Society also recruited teachers in the North to work in the South educating freedmen and their children.

In addition to Straight University, the AMA helped found several other historically black colleges and universities, such as Clark Atlanta University, Fisk University, Hampton University, Howard University (with Freedmen's Bureau), Huston-Tillotson University, LeMoyne-Owen College, Talladega College, and Tougaloo College. Straight University and Union Normal School later became known and developed as Straight College and New Orleans University, respectively. Both schools offered education for elementary-level teachers, but quickly enlarged their curricula to include secondary, collegiate, and professional-level instruction.

New Orleans University operated a secondary school—Gilbert Academy.  By the 1890s, the university offered professional medical training. It included a school of pharmacy, the Flint Medical College, and the Sarah Goodridge Hospital and Nurse Training School.  After the medical college was closed in 1911, the Flint Goodridge Hospital emerged and continued nurse training.

"A Great Negro University in New Orleans": 1930–1935 

Local Black and White leaders felt there was a need to develop a larger, more notable African-American institution of higher learning in New Orleans and the greater South. Due to economic hardships and rounds of negotiations between the two institutions, Straight College and New Orleans University chartered Dillard University on June 6, 1930.

Named after James H. Dillard, the new university was created to "... offer a traditional liberal arts curriculum—rather than nonprofessional, vocational training" and emphasize a close engagement with the Black community through "various education extension programs, societies, and clubs." Its development was tempered by the Jim Crow era. Many local whites took issue with the possibility of a black president presiding over white faculty members. The increased numbers of African-American bus riders in the Gentilly area, as students started attending classes, disturbed some white residents. Edgar B. Stern Sr, an influential and diplomatic member of Dillard's board of trustees, suggested Will W. Alexander as a compromise candidate for president. A white Southern preacher, he became Dillard's first acting president (1935–1936). His experience as the director of the Commission on Interracial Cooperation proved valuable.  Dillard University opened its doors in the fall of 1935, and was able to attract  prominent scholars such as Horace Mann Bond, psychology and education; Frederick Douglass Hall, music; Lawrence D. Reddick, history; and St. Clair Drake, sociology and anthropology.

Hurricane Katrina 
In August 2005, the campus, not far from the lower levee breach of the London Avenue Canal, suffered extensive flood damage in the aftermath of Hurricane Katrina. Nelson Hall was destroyed by a fire. A bus fire destroyed belongings of 37 students who were in the process of being evacuated.

In spring 2006, the students of Dillard University took their classes at The New Orleans World Trade Center and The New Orleans Hilton Riverside Hotel. As is tradition, Dillard held graduation on the Rosa Freeman Keller Avenue of the Oaks in July 2006. Students returned to campus in September 2006.

Ray Charles Program
In 2003, musician Ray Charles added a provision in his will to endow a $1 million professorship of African-American culinary history at Dillard. It is the first such position in the country and is called the Ray Charles Program.

2016 senatorial debate 

In November 2016, Raycom Media rented a space at Dillard University to host a debate with senatorial candidates, including David Duke. The event was met with opposition; six protesters were arrested. When the rental agreement was made, months in advance, the university was unaware of the candidates.

Partnership with Ross University School of Medicine
In 2019, Dillard signed a partnership with a for-profit college, Ross University School of Medicine, to increase the number of African American physicians in the US.

Scott's donation
In 2020, MacKenzie Scott donated $5 million to Dillard University.  Her donation is the largest single gift in Dillard's history.

Academics 

Dillard University offers Bachelor of Arts, Bachelor of Science, and Bachelor of Science in Nursing degrees in over 35 majors. These majors are organized within four academic colleges, and further subdivided by departments.

Undergraduate research 
The university is a member of the Council of Undergraduate Research and the National Council of Undergraduate Research.  Most departments offer courses in methodology, and the university's Office of Undergraduate Research organizes additional workshops on writing proposals, analyzing data, and using human participants.  Students can participate in A Katrina Recovery Initiative (AKRI), Louisiana Alliance for Minority Participation (LAMP), and the Undergraduate Research & Creative Work Competition.  The university also produces the Dillard University Journal of Undergraduate Research (DUJOUR), which publishes the findings and articles of finished undergraduate research projects.

Institute of Jazz Culture (IOJC) 
The Institute of Jazz Culture was established in 2002 by founding director, Irvin Mayfield at the intersection of community, jazz and education.  Under the current leadership of Edward Anderson, Assistant Professor of Music and Director of the IOJC, the institute is producing curriculum and programming on the collegiate and the secondary levels.

Dual degree programs
Dillard has dual degree programs in multiple disciplines with institutions such as Louisiana State University, Tulane University, University of New Orleans, Georgia Institute of Technology, Columbia University, Texas Chiropractic College, and Western Michigan University.

Athletics 

The Dillard athletic teams are called the Bleu Devils and Lady Bleu Devils. The university is a member of the National Association of Intercollegiate Athletics (NAIA), primarily competing in the Gulf Coast Athletic Conference (GCAC) since the 1981–82 academic year.

Dillard competes in 12 intercollegiate varsity sports: Men's sports include baseball, basketball, cross country, tennis and track & field; while women's sports include basketball, cross country, tennis, track & field and volleyball; and co-ed sports include cheerleading and dance.

Facilities
The Dillard basketball teams and volleyball team play at Dent Hall.

Campus 
The campus is anchored by Neoclassical architecture and live oak trees. The double tree-lined "Avenue of the Oaks" forms the focal point of the gated campus.

Academic buildings 
DUICEF (Dillard University International Center for Economic Freedom) was dedicated in 2004. It houses the offices of the Division of Education & Psychology and the Division of Social Sciences, and computer and language laboratories.

Howard House, built in 1936, was originally a guest house, but currently is home to the business program. The building was named in honor of New Orleans native Alvin Pike Howard (1889–1937), successful businessman, former professor of Tulane University and former director of Hibernia National Bank; he is a noteworthy contributor to the development of Dillard University.

The Professional Schools Building is the newest academic building on campus. It was dedicated in 2010. The building is home to academic and research programs for the College of Business, School of Nursing, School of Public Health, and the Department of Science, Technology, Engineering and Mathematics.

Rosenwald Hall is a hall at Dillard University. Dillard's first permanent building was originally the campus library. It was built in May 1934. The building is named in honor of philanthropist Julius Rosenwald, to whom the building was dedicated in June 1948. This building houses the university's administrative offices and was under construction due to damage in the aftermath of Hurricane Katrina, but has since re-opened.

Samuel DuBois Cook Fine Arts and Communications Center at Dillard University, New Orleans, was built in 1993. The building is named in honor of Dillard University's sixth president, Samuel DuBois Cook. With his tenure came the start of the modernization of Dillard University's infrastructure. In the building are the Fine Arts Gallery and studios, state-of-the-art television and recording studios, the Music Department, the Drama Department and a theater, and a radio station.

Stern Hall is a hall at Dillard University. Dillard's science building was built in 1952. It is named in honor of Edgar Bloom Stern, a prominent financier and philanthropist of New Orleans. The building was renovated in 1952 and again in 1968. In the building are the Division of Nursing, Division of Natural Sciences, two computer labs, Biology, Chemistry and Physics labs as well as a learning center sponsored by the Louisiana Alliance for Minority Participation (LAMP) program.

Athletic facilities 
Dent Hall at Dillard University, New Orleans, is the university's gymnasium. It was named in honor of Albert W. Dent, the university's third president. It was built in 1969 at the end of his service. Dent Hall is the home of the Bleu Devils and the Lady Bleu Devils basketball teams (Athletics Department).
In this building are The Division of Campus Life, Career Services, Student Development, Student Government Association, the Daniel C. Thompson/Samuel Dubois Cook Honors Program, offices, classrooms, computer labs, a dance studio, a weight center and an Olympic-size swimming pool.

Henson Hall is Dillard University's old gymnasium, which was built in 1950 and renovated in 1990. The building is named in honor of an explorer and co-discoverer of the North Pole, Matthew Alexander Henson. He was the first human of African descent to reach the North Pole. The university's bookstore and temporary library are housed in Henson Hall due to space constraints following Hurricane Katrina.

Library 
Will W. Alexander Library is Dillard University's library. It was built in 1961. The library was dedicated in honor of the first acting president of Dillard University, Will W. Alexander on October 22, 1961. The library houses an extensive collection of books, journals, microform and newspapers, as well as such historical documents as the papers of the American Missionary Association of the United Church of Christ. The library was damaged in the aftermath of Hurricane Katrina and reopened in April 2008.

Chapel 
Lawless Memorial Chapel is Dillard University's chapel. It was built in 1955.
Chapel was dedicated to the memory of Alfred Lawless Jr. and his son Theodore K. Lawless on October 23, 1955. Now named Lawless Assembly Hall, it is the only building on Dillard's campus that did not suffer flood damage in the aftermath of Hurricane Katrina.

On-campus housing 
Camphor Hall is a dormitory at Dillard University, built in 1947. This female dormitory was originally a male dormitory. The building was named in honor of a Louisiana native, educator and missionary, Bishop Alexander Priestly Camphor. This dormitory is connected to Hartzell Hall.

Hartzell Hall is a dormitory at Dillard University, built in 1935. Hartzell is named in honor of Joseph Crane Hartzell, a missionary bishop for the Methodist Episcopal Church. The building was originally a junior and senior female dormitory, and  re-opened in the fall of 2013. This dormitory is connected to Camphor Hall.

Straight Hall is a dormitory at Dillard University, built in 1936 and renovated in 1957. Straight Hall was originally a female dormitory in its earliest days.  The building is named in honor of Seymour Straight, president of the Board of Trustees of Straight College, which opened in 1869 and later in 1930 merged with New Orleans University to form Dillard University. Re-opened in the spring of 2013.

Williams Hall is a female dormitory building located to the left of Kearny hall. It was dedicated in honor of noted New Orleanian educator and philanthropist Fannie C. Williams (1882–1980) in June 1946. The building was renovated in 2000 and became a co-ed dormitory in 2014.

Gentilly Gardens is on campus apartment style housing at Dillard University. These co-ed apartment blocks house junior and senior students.

Nelson Complex consisted of three modular buildings that served as undergraduate housing for students. Named after William Nelson, the first African American president of the university, it was destroyed by fire during Hurricane Katrina.

Student center 
Kearny Hall is the student center at Dillard University. It was built in 1935 and renovated in 1966 and 1996. This building is named in honor of New Orleanian Warren Kearny, Trustee of Dillard University. Kearny Hall is located at the center of the campus. In the building are a lounge area, post office,  cafeteria, food service offices, as well as the Student Government Association office. The cafeteria section was remodeled during the summer of 2019, updating the interior design.

President's house 
Built in 1936, the president's residence has been renovated three times: 1964, 1972 and 1997. It has been home to six of the seven presidents of Dillard University. It now serves as the Alumni House.

Notable alumni 
 The following notable individuals are alumni of Dillard University, Straight University, or New Orleans University:

References

External links 

 Official website
 Official athletics website
 Student newspaper

 3D Models of University Buildings:
 (Lawless Memorial Chapel) 
 (Kearny Hall) 

 
Libraries in Louisiana
Academic libraries
Universities and colleges affiliated with the United Church of Christ
Universities and colleges accredited by the Southern Association of Colleges and Schools
American Missionary Association
Educational institutions established in 1869
1869 establishments in Louisiana
Universities and colleges formed by merger in the United States
Private universities and colleges in Louisiana
Education in New Orleans